Haikou New Port is a seaport in Hainan, China. Formerly known as the Inner Harbour, this port is located on the southern side of the mouth of the Nandu River 7 km east of Haikou Xiuying Port. Prior to around 2016, it was main distribution centre for cargo entering Hainan, including seafood, with a wholesale fish market located at the far eastern end. The wholesale fish market is now located in the middle of Xinbu Island. Haikou New Port was also a major port for immigration onto Hainan Island.

The site was first used as a seaport during the Song Dynasty. In 1953, the port was structurally improved with the addition of cement foundations. In 1973, the Guangdong provincial government invested nearly 200 million RMB for an expansion of the site. Improvements included increasing the depth of the water, which had been reduced due to silting. Storage facilities, a yard, and waiting room were also added, to increase the capacity of the port to 40 million tons annually.

Fish market

A fish market was located at the eastern end of the port. It provided seafood to markets and restaurants around the city. Large sea fish were sold, as well as squid, shellfish, and smaller fish. Adjacent buildings housed operations related to this market. They stored and processed fish, and produced ice blocks to be chipped and sold to the dealers.

The main fish market for Haikou is now located in the middle of Xinbu Island to the east.

See .

Routes
Routes include:

Passengers and goods
 Hai'an
 Beihai
 Zhanjiang
 Shenzhen
 Guangzhou

Domestic container routes
 Guangzhou
 Beihai
 Zhanjiang
 Quanzhou
 Tianjin
 Dalian
 Qinhuangdao

International container routes
 Hong Kong
 Kaohsiung
 Shibushi
 Kokura
 Hiroshima

Gallery

References

External links
 

1953 establishments in China
Ports and harbours of Hainan